The ninth cycle of Holland's Next Top Model premiered on 30 August 2016 on RTL5. Anouk Smulders returned as the show's host for the new cycle. Judges May-Britt Mobach and Dirk Kikstra were replaced by fashion blogger Anna Nooshin and fashion photographer Alek Bruessing. Fred van Leer remained in place as a mentor for the contestants, but also acted as a fourth judge at eliminations. The new cycle featured an emphasis on social media and branding, with heavier involvement from fans of the show.

The prizes for this cycle included a modelling contract with Touché Models valued at €50,000, an editorial feature for JFK magazine, a contract to become a blogger for the show's network, RTL, and a brand new Opel Adam.

The winner of the competition was 20 year-old Akke Marije Marinus, from Dokkum.

Format changes
Keeping in line with the show's new focus on models as influencers, the cycle saw heavy involvement from the public nearing the end of the competition. The final three episodes of the season were all held live, though only the finale was held in front of a studio audience. At the beginning of the cycle's seventh and eighth episodes, all of the remaining contestants were put up for a public vote through SMS. These episodes went over pre-recorded footage of photo shoots and activities that the finalists had taken part in some months prior. At the end of these episodes, the results from the voting were revealed to the models in real-time.

The cycle also featured a comeback round through which one of the previously eliminated contestants could return to the competition. In contrast to the American version however, the viewers were not involved in the decision. Judge Anna Nooshin evaluated each models' impact on social media, and made the decision based on their networking growth over the course of the competition.

During the cycle's live final, Colette Kanza was brought back as one of the four finalists. Kanza had originally been eliminated in episode 6. For the first time in the show's history, the viewer vote decided the results of the live final in their entirety.

Cast

Contestants
(Ages stated are at start of contest)

Judges
 Anouk Smulders (host)
 Alek Bruessing  
 Fred van Leer
 Anna Nooshin

Episodes

Call out order

 The contestant was eliminated
 The contestant quit the competition
 The contestant won the competition

Notes

References

External links
Official website
 

Holland's Next Top Model
2016 Dutch television seasons